The A148 is an English A road entirely in the county of Norfolk. It runs from King's Lynn to Cromer via Fakenham, which it bypasses to the north.

Route

King’s Lynn starting point

Starting at the western end, A148 starts as an exit from a roundabout on the A47. It runs in a northerly direction, as Saddlebow Road, through the King’s Lynn suburb of South Lynn. In just over  Saddlebow Road becomes Wisbech Road and crosses the River Nar. The road now joins a roundabout at the bottom end of King's Lynn. At this roundabout the A149, Hardwick Road, runs of to the right whilst the B1144 is straight across the island and runs around the eastern skirt of the town. The A148 turns right and northward and is now called London Road. The road soon passes under the South Gate of what were once the town's defences. This gateway was built during the reign of Edward III of England. It is brick built with stone surrounds to the arches. The gate only straddles the northbound carriage way and was restored at a cost of £80,000 in 1982. The road now takes a route through the heart of King's Lynn as St James Road and after  enters a one way system as Railway Road. At  the road turns right into Austin Road and at its junction with Littleport Road it reverts to a two way carriageway again, and after a short distance crosses a bridge over the Gaywood River and becomes Gaywood Road. The road soon passes the King Edward VII School on the right and on out into the Suburb of Gaywood. Gaywood road then becomes Lynn Road and now after  from the start the road takes a left turn into Wooton Road. The road direction is now to the north east towards South Wooton. At  the road comes to a 'T' Junction controlled by traffic lights. From the left is the A1078 which terminates at this junction and to the right the A148 continues on its way out of King's Lynn. Now Grimston Road, the road inclines towards a large roundabout.

King’s Lynn to Hillington

It is now  since the start and the roundabout is the junction with the A149 Queen Elizabeth Way. The A148 continues on over the roundabout now signposted to Fakenham and Cromer. The road is now characterised by long straights through dense woodland on both sides of the carriageway. After  the road crosses the River Cong, and a turning on the left which is the B1440 to Sandringham and the Royal Estate there. At  the village of Hillington is reached. On the left as you enter the village is a filling station and the three-hundred-year-old coaching inn called the Ffolkes Arms Hotel. Many years ago the attic rooms of this Inn were used to lock up prisoners overnight who were being transported to Norwich Prison.  further on from the hotel is the gatehouse entrance to Hillington Hall. The purchaser was Martin Ffolkes who was the Attorney-General to Queen Catherine who was the wife of Charles II.

Hillington to Fakenham
The road now skirts the boundary wall of Hillington Park on its left and passes the B1153 (southbound) to Grimston on the right. At the end of the wall on the left the road passes the junction with the northbound B1153 to Flitcham. The road now heads in an easterly direction over undulating West Norfolk countryside towards Harpley. At the  mark, the long distant footpath Peddars Way cross the road south to north at Harpley Dams just before the village. Peddars way is an old Roman road. From here the road inclines sharply. The road has an overtaking lane on the Eastbound carriage way which allows passing only on that carriage way and is marked with double white lines on the westbound carriageway. The village Harpley is bypassed on the right hand side. A brown tourist signpost on the left points out the road to nearby Houghton Hall just out of the village. The next section of the road towards the villages of East and West Rudham are characterised by long straight sections of road. Now having travelled  from the beginning the road reaches West Rudham. In the heart of the village on the left is a 17th-century Inn called the Duke’s Head. The pub is a free house and has log fires. At  the road passes through East Rudham passing on the left side of the village green and the Crown public house which is located on the eastern side of the green. On the way out of the village the road also passes a pub on the left called the Cat and Fiddle but was formally the Bakers Arms. Further on the road reaches the villages of Tattersett on the left and Coxford on the right and crosses the Culvert of the River Tat a tributary of the River Wensum although you can not see the river from the road. After passing the junction of the B1454 to Docking on the left, the road now crosses an area of rolling hills and dips and passes the former airbase of RAF Sculthorpe on left. The road then drops down towards the village of Sculthorpe by-passing it on the left. At  the road passes the junction of the B1355 to South Creake and the Burnhams on the left. This stretch of road between this junction and before reaching a traffic island which marks the start of the Fakenham by-pass, is called Creake Road.

Fakenham to Cromer

At the roundabout the A1065 from Swaffham joins from the right. Straight across is the old route of the road called Wells Road which takes you into the center of Fakenham. The A148 bares left and now by-passes the town swinging around to the north passing the B1105 to Wells-next-the-Sea on the left. Now at  the road comes to another roundabout. The road to the right is A1067 from Norwich which terminates at the island. Straight over the island is the continuing A148.
According to the Norfolk Safety Camera Partnership, the siting of this camera has resulted in only 1% of drivers breaking the speed limit along this section of the road, although before and after accident figures are not available. The Junction right to Kettlestone just past this site has always been a notorious accident Black Spot, as has the staggered cross road Junction at Little Snoring just beyond. At  the road passes through part of Little Snoring and through a cross road junction with Snoring Road. On the right just past the junction is the Green Man Public House. For the next  the road dips and rise through scenic woodland on either side of the road crossing the River Stiffkey at Brookhill plantation. On the right at Thursford is another filling station and a restaurant called the Old Forge. Dating from the 14th century the old forge was once a coaching station and many years ago was a resting place for pilgrims making their way to Walsingham Abbey. Today it is a popular seafood restaurant. Now at  since the start, the road emerges from the woodland and reaches a junction where the B1354 sweeps away to the right towards Melton Constable. The A148 swings northeast up an incline over a crossroads and past the Crawfish public house on the left which serves Thai food. The route now inclines and straightens out passing through more woodland before entering an area of open countryside. This long straight takes you to another filling station on the left. Bale Filling station marks  from the start.

 The road takes a long sweeping bend toward the north east and once again the road is characterised by long straight section across open countryside. At  the road to the left at the crossroads is the B1156 to the village of Langham, the right hand lane leads to the village of Sharrington.  further on from the crossroads the road narrows in width and enters a section that is undulating and includes some very sharp blind bends. Drivers should be mindful of the fact that this road is used considerably by HGVs and this section should be driven with great care. At  the road passes through the village of Letheringsett. On the right in the centre of the village is the Kings Head Public House which is a fine example of a Georgian Building. Also on this junction is one of two Watermills in the village. The road crosses the River Glaven next to this redundant mill and 100 m further on passes a Brown Tourist sign locating the second Watermill on the right. Letheringsett Watermill is the last remaining watermill in Norfolk to produce flour. In the past the A148 passed through the center of this Georgian town but today it by-passes the center. At the next roundabout the road turns left on to the bypass. The road to the right is the B1110 to Melton Constable, the road straight over the island is the B1149 to Norwich. The by-pass was built on the old track bed of the Midland & Great Northern Joint Railway. At  the road from the left marks the point were the by-pass rejoins the old route of the A148. Just before this junction is Holt Station on the preserved part of the afore mentioned railway. It is the North Norfolk Railway which runs from Holt via Weybourne to Sheringham. The road now passes through High Kelling and out into the open countryside.

 further on is the junction with the road on the left which takes travellers to the village of Upper Sheringham. Also at this junction there is a brown Tourist Sign indicating the entrance, 10 m from the junction, to Sheringham Park which is a National Trust property. The roads route now takes the high ground parallel with the coast. This high ground is called the Cromer Ridge and is on average about 90 meters above sea level, the highest point of Norfolk is located on this ridge at Beacon Hill at 105 meters above sea level. At 39½ is the left hand junction to Sheringham on the A1082. At  is the left hand turn to Beeston Regis (the location of the top picture of the road sign). Continuing on and the road passes a public house called the Roman Camp Inn on the right hand side of the road. There is a filling station here also on the right. The woodland on the right hand side of the road marks the boundary of the Felbrigg Estate, also in the hands of the National Trust. After  the next junction at a roundabout is the B1436 to Roughton. Reaching the final part of the road the route now crosses the bridge of the Bittern Line railway that links Norwich to Cromer and Sheringham, and drops down the Cromer Ridge, past the North Norfolk District Council Headquarters on the right into the town of Cromer. At this section, the road has the designation of Holt road before becoming West Street after a Mini roundabout as it approaches the town Center. There is a Public House called the White Horse on the Left and just 50 m further on the A148 reaches its Terminus/Start at a junction with the A149.

Mileage

Gallery

In popular culture

The protagonist of Elly Griffiths' Ruth Galloway series teaches at the University of North Norfolk and lives in remote seaside college near King's Lynn. She and other characters in the series regularly face challenges navigating that road in the fog, slippery road conditions, and blinding inclement weather.

References

Roads in England
Transport in Norfolk
Roads in Norfolk